The 1971–72 Louisville Cardinals men's basketball team represented the University of Louisville during the 1971–72 NCAA Division I men's basketball season, Louisville's 59th season of intercollegiate competition. The Cardinals competed in the Missouri Valley Conference and were coached by Denny Crum, who was in his first season. The team played its home games at Freedom Hall.

Louisville defeated Memphis State 83–72 in the Missouri Valley Conference playoff to earn an automatic bid to the NCAA tournament. They beat Kansas State to win the NCAA tournament Midwest Regional and advance to the Final Four (their 2nd) where they fell to eventual champion UCLA, 96–77. They finished fourth, falling to North Carolina in the third-place game 105–91. The Cardinals finished with a 26–5 (12–2) record.

References

Louisville Cardinals men's basketball seasons
Louisville
NCAA Division I men's basketball tournament Final Four seasons
Louisville
Louisville Cardinals men's basketball, 1971-72
Louisville Cardinals men's basketball, 1971-72